"Sandmann" is a single from German Neue Deutsche Härte band Oomph!. It is the 4th and last single from the band's tenth album Monster as it was included in the reissue of the album.

Music video
The music video seemingly takes place in Germany during the economic depression of the 1920s. It carries the message that the lyrics of the song are trying to present, and depicts the differences between a rich family and a poor family. The video follows a wealthy young girl and a young boy that lives in poverty. The two meet when the boy is playing with a ball, and the little girl retrieves it for him. The girl's father disapproves of her befriending the boy because he is poor. The children attempt to run away together, and are found by their parents in the woods by the end of the video. Throughout the video, the story is interrupted by the band playing the song, and images of a grim reaper-like character often shows up. The band also can be seen dressed in suits walking in the main street of the video. Dero is getting his shoes shined, the boy runs into Flux when he steals an apple, and Crap is also in the town. The main message of the story is based on a real story called "The Sandman", a child horror story.

Standard track listing 
 "Sandmann" ("Sandman") - 3:50
 "Sandmann ([:SITD:] Remix)" - 4:50

Limited track listing 
 "Sandmann" ("Sandman")
 "Sandmann ([:SITD:] Remix)"
 "Du lügst" (You lie)
 "Auf Kurs" (On course)
 "Sandmann" (Videotrack)
 "Auf Kurs" (Videotrack)
 "Labyrinth" (Videotrack)

External links 
 

Songs about fictional male characters
Songs about poverty
2009 singles
Oomph! songs
2009 songs
Songs written by Dero Goi